Gwendoline Philippe (born 28 June 1999) is a French karateka. She won one of the bronze medals in the women's kumite 61 kg event at the 2019 European Games held in Minsk, Belarus. In the semi-finals she lost against Tjaša Ristić of Slovenia.

At the 2018 European Karate Championships held in Novi Sad, Serbia, she won the bronze medal in the team kumite event.

Achievements

References

External links 
 

Living people
1999 births
People from Bagnols-sur-Cèze
French female karateka
European Games medalists in karate
European Games bronze medalists for France
Karateka at the 2019 European Games
Sportspeople from Gard
21st-century French women